GabryN ( (born Gabriela Ann Xuereb; 18 March 1993) is a Gozitan singer-songwriter, rapper, model, and activist from the island of Malta. She hails from Xewkija, Gozo Island, Malta. Besides her native Maltese, she also is fluent in English, Italian, and Spanish.

Early life and career
Gabriela was born and raised in Xewkija, Gozo to Zachary Xuereb and Josephine Xuereb née Grima. She made her debut in 2000 as a child singer at the age of eight with the song I Have a Dream, which is officially sung by the Swedish group ABBA. From a very young age, she showed interest in singing and dancing. She started taking part in local festivals in Gozo and also in Malta where she achieved good placings and often won titles like Best Voice and Most Promising Singer.

2010–2012: Debut album and more achievements
In 2010, she entered the Malta EuroSong for the first time and made it to the Top 50 (Phase 2) with two songs. That year she also released a single, "Where Are You Now", and entered the Top 10 in a UK-based chart. Gabriela released her debut album "Rising Star" in the same year, and it contained fifteen tracks. The tracks were in both English and Maltese languages.

In early 2011, Gabriela was the supporting act for the Romanian-born British-based duo The Cheeky Girls. Gabriela N was also featured on Malta to Midem CD with seventeen other Maltese artists. This project promotes artists internationally.

2014–2016 

Gabriela was contacted by an academy that is situated in the United Kingdom and is facilitated by England, Wales, and Canada. This academy is known as "WAALM" (which is short for (THE WORLD ACADEMY OF ARTS, LITERATURE, AND MEDIA) Gabriela was chosen by this academy to join four (4) continents and twenty plus (20+) countries for one (1) of the biggest musical projects for humanity in the world as the "VOICE OF MALTA" to record a message song called "WALK IN STYLE" and is dedicated for the victims of bullying. In addition, a music video was also in the works and was released. The music video was produced by RSVP Digital Productions which is a film company and is situated in the Philippines the music video was filmed in Taytay which is in the province of Rizal, Philippines. Gabriela's music video was featured on MTV and VH1's official channel and was successfully getting a lot of airplay.

2014 – present

The song "Lie to Me" was produced in a few weeks, and soon after Gabriela went to Hollywood, CA to record the song where she spent three weeks there and a week and a half in New York where she visited the music station that she entered. The song's debut was on 8 October 2016 and was released under the record label InRage Entertainment (sub-label of Sony Music)

Personal life
Gabriela is the youngest of two children in her family. She has one older brother, Ivan (1987). She is related to Mgr. Alfred Xuereb from her mother's side.

Discography
 Rising Star (2010)
WALK IN STYLE (2014)
LIE TO ME (2016)

References

1993 births
21st-century Maltese women singers
21st-century Maltese singers
Living people
People from Xewkija
Gozitan singers